The 1963 Major League Baseball season was contested from April 8 to October 6, 1963. The American League and National League both featured ten teams, with each team playing a 162-game schedule.

In the World Series, the Los Angeles Dodgers swept the New York Yankees in four straight games. The Dodgers' stellar pitching staff, anchored by left-hander Sandy Koufax and right-hander Don Drysdale, was so dominant that the vaunted Yankees, despite the presence of sluggers such as Mickey Mantle and Roger Maris in their lineup, never took a lead against Los Angeles the entire Series.

Champions

Major League Baseball
World Series: Los Angeles Dodgers over New York Yankees (4–0); Sandy Koufax, MVP
All-Star Game, July 9 at Municipal Stadium: National League, 5–3; Willie Mays, MVP

Awards and honors

Baseball Hall of Fame
John Clarkson
Elmer Flick
Sam Rice
Eppa Rixey
Most Valuable Player
Elston Howard, New York Yankees, C (AL)
Sandy Koufax, Los Angeles Dodgers, P (NL)
Cy Young Award
Sandy Koufax, Los Angeles Dodgers
Rookie of the Year
Gary Peters, Chicago White Sox, P (AL)
Pete Rose, Cincinnati Reds, 2B (NL)
Gold Glove Award
Vic Power (1B) (AL) 
Bobby Richardson (2B) (AL) 
Brooks Robinson (3B) (AL) 
Zoilo Versalles (SS) (AL) 
Jim Landis (OF) (AL) 
Al Kaline (OF) (AL) 
Carl Yastrzemski (OF) (AL)
Elston Howard (C) (AL) 
Jim Kaat (P) (AL)

MLB statistical leaders

1 National League Triple Crown Pitching Winner

Season recap
In the American League, the Yankees were in the 4th of 5 straight pennant winning years, and, led by MVP Elston Howard, cruised to the American League title by 10.5 games over the 2nd place White Sox.

In the National League, most experts figured the San Francisco Giants and Los Angeles Dodgers would be locked in another battle for the pennant, much like 1962 when the Giants came from behind and beat the Dodgers in a playoff. The Dodgers started slowly, perhaps feeling the hangover effect from blowing the pennant the year before. They were 2 games under .500 in early May, and trailed the surprising St. Louis Cardinals by 4.5 games. Then their pitching asserted itself, and on August 28, the Dodgers led the Giants by 5.5 games and the Cardinals by 6.5 games. The Cardinals proceeded to win 19 of their next 20 games and, while the Dodgers didn't exactly slump, they went "only" 14–7 during that same period. Thus, the Dodgers went into St. Louis on September 16 to play the Cardinals in a 3-game series leading by only 1 game. With the memory of blowing the 1962 pennant fresh in their minds, the Dodgers proceeded to sweep the Cardinals and take a 4-game lead with 7 games to go. The key game was the third one; the Cardinals led 5–1 in the 8th inning and a win would move them back to within 2 games of L.A. But the Dodgers got 3 in the 8th and in the top of the 9th, late season call up Dick Nen, in only his 8th major league at bat, hit a pinch hit homer to force extra innings. The Cardinals got a leadoff triple from Dick Groat in the 10th but could not score. The Dodgers then scored an unearned run in the 13th inning and won, 6–5. The disheartened Cardinals then lost their next 3 games as well while the Dodgers won 3 of their next 4 to clinch the pennant with 6 games left.

Standings

American League

National League

Postseason

Bracket

Managers

American League

National League

Home Field Attendance

Events
January 10 – Chicago Cubs owner Philip K. Wrigley creates the position of athletic director, and hires ex-Air Force Academy director Robert Whitlow. Whitlow's lack of experience lead to him being ignored by general manager John Holland and manager Bob Kennedy, and he resigns in January 1965.
January 27 – Sam Rice, Eppa Rixey, Elmer Flick and John Clarkson are elected to the Baseball Hall of Fame by the Special Veterans Committee.
March 22 – The New York Mets, who finished last in the National League with a 40–120 record in their inaugural season, purchase pitcher Carlton Willey from the Milwaukee Braves. Willey will boost a pitching rotation that include Roger Craig, Al Jackson and Tracy Stallard. The Mets will improve to 51–111 in that season.
April 13: After 11 hitless at bats, Cincinnati second baseman Pete Rose records his first major league hit, a triple off Pittsburgh's Bob Friend. Increased enforcement of the balk rule produces a major-league record seven in the Pirates' 12–4 trouncing at Crosley Field. Friend commits four of the balks.
May 11 – Sandy Koufax hurls his second no-hitter in as many seasons, blanking the San Francisco Giants 8–0 at Dodger Stadium. The final out is made by Harvey Kuenn on a ground ball back to none other than Koufax. Kuenn will also make the final out of Koufax's perfect game two years later.
May 17 – Houston Colt .45's pitcher Don Nottebart throws the first no-hitter in franchise history, leading his team past the Philadelphia Phillies, 4–1.
June 2 – Willie Mays hits 3 home runs helping San Francisco Giants beat St. Louis Cardinals 6–4.
June 9 – Ernie Banks hits 3 home runs.
June 10 – Al Kaline hits 200th career home run helping Detroit Tigers beat Boston Red Sox 6–1.
June 15 – Juan Marichal of the San Francisco Giants no-hits the Houston Colt .45's 1–0 at Candlestick Park. The no-hitter is the first by a Giant since the franchise's move from New York City after the 1957 season.
July 9 – At Municipal Stadium, the National League wins 5–3 over the American League in the All-Star Game. After four years, MLB had decided to return to the original single-game format. The American League out-hit the National League 11–6, but the effort went in vain as MVP Willie Mays put on a one-man show. Although he was held to a single, Mays collected two runs, two RBI, two stolen bases and made the defensive play of the game — a running catch that deprived Joe Pepitone of an extra base in the eighth inning. This game also marked the 24th and final All-Star appearance of Stan Musial, who pinch-hit in the fifth inning. He lined out to right field, leaving behind a .317 batting average (20-for-63) and an All-Star Game record of six home runs.
July 13 – Early Wynn of the Cleveland Indians earns his 300th career win.
August 27 – Willie Mays hits 400th career home run helping San Francisco Giants beat St. Louis Cardinals 7–2.
September 5 – Willie McCovey hits 100th career home run.
September 15 – All three Alou brothers – Felipe, Matty and Jesus, play in the outfield for the San Francisco Giants in a 15–3 victory over the Pittsburgh Pirates.
September 18 – In the final game ever played at the Polo Grounds, the Philadelphia Phillies defeat the New York Mets 5–1. New York gets its only run on Jim Hickman's 4th-inning home run, the last home run to be hit at the park.
September 22 – Willie McCovey hits 3 home runs helping San Francisco Giants beat New York Mets 13–4.
September 29 – In his final MLB at-bat, Stan Musial got an RBI single off Jim Maloney in the sixth inning of the St. Louis Cardinals' 3–2 win over the Cincinnati Reds (in 14 innings) at Busch Stadium I.
October 6 – At Dodger Stadium, Sandy Koufax defeats the New York Yankees, 2–1, completing a shocking World Series sweep for the Los Angeles Dodgers. Whitey Ford gives up only two hits, both by Frank Howard, who belts a long home run in the fifth inning to start the Dodgers' scoring. In the Series, the Yankees bat just .171 and score only four runs, the second-lowest total in World Series history. Curiously enough, the Dodgers would set the mark for the least runs scored in a World Series only three years later, falling victim to a decisive sweep at the hands of the Baltimore Orioles.
October 12 – In the first (and last) Hispanic American major league All-Star Game, the National League team beats the American League 5–2 at the Polo Grounds. The game features such names as Felipe Alou, Luis Aparicio, Orlando Cepeda, Roberto Clemente, Julián Javier, Minnie Miñoso, Tony Oliva and Zoilo Versalles. Vic Power receives a pregame award as the number one Latin player. NL starter Juan Marichal strikes out six in four innings, though reliever Al McBean is the winning pitcher. Pinch hitter Manny Mota drives in two runs against loser Pedro Ramos. This was the last baseball game played at the Polo Grounds, as the New York Mets moved into the brand new Shea Stadium in 1964.

Births

January–March
January 2 – David Cone
January 2 – Edgar Martínez
January 4 – Daryl Boston
January 5 – Jeff Fassero
January 6 – Norm Charlton
January 7 – Craig Shipley
January 22 – Jeff Treadway
February 10 – Lenny Dykstra
February 11 – Todd Benzinger
February 15 – Barry Jones
February 22 – Don Wakamatsu
February 23 – Bobby Bonilla
February 25 – Paul O'Neill
March 1 – Tony Castillo
March 1 – Rich Rodriguez
March 9 – Terry Mulholland
March 10 – John Cangelosi
March 13 – Mariano Duncan
March 14 – Mike Rochford
March 20 – Dana Williams
March 21 – Shawon Dunston
March 26 – Luis Medina

April–June
April 3 – Chris Bosio
April 9 – Mike Brumley
April 9 – José Guzmán
April 10 – Mike Devereaux
April 10 – Jeff Gray
April 13 – Mark Leiter
April 21 – Ken Caminiti
May 14 – Pat Borders
May 20 – David Wells
May 27 – Edwin Núñez
June 2 – Bryan Harvey
June 25 – Mike Stanley

July–September
July 4 – José Oquendo
July 6 – Lance Johnson
July 14 – John Dopson
July 17 – Bobby Thigpen
July 18 – Mike Greenwell
July 19 – Mark Carreon
July 31 – Scott Bankhead
August 8 – Ron Karkovice
August 20 – Kal Daniels
September 3 – Eric Plunk
September 5 – Jeff Brantley
September 10 – Randy Johnson
September 21 – Cecil Fielder
September 25 – Eric Hetzel
September 28 – Charlie Kerfeld

October–December
October 1 – Mark McGwire
October 4 – Bruce Ruffin
October 9 – Félix Fermín
October 12 – Luis Polonia
October 27 – Bip Roberts
October 31 – Fred McGriff
October 31 – Matt Nokes
November 8 – Dwight Smith
November 18 – Dante Bichette
November 23 – Dale Sveum
November 28 – Walt Weiss
December 1 – Greg W. Harris
December 3 – Damon Berryhill
December 7 – Shane Mack
December 10 – Doug Henry
December 27 – Jim Leyritz
December 28 – Mel Stottlemyre Jr.

Deaths

January–March
January 2 – Al Mamaux, 68, pitcher who twice won 20 games for Pittsburgh
January 5 – Rogers Hornsby, 66, Hall of Fame second baseman who posted the highest lifetime batting average (.358) of any right-handed batter, 7-time batting champion including a .424 mark in 1924; twice MVP, and the first NL player to hit 300 home runs
January 29 – Lee Meadows, 68, pitcher won 188 games for the Cardinals, Phillies and Pirates, was first modern major leaguer to wear glasses
January 31 – Ossie Vitt, 73, third baseman for the Tigers and Red Sox, later a minor league manager
February 9 – Ray Starr, 56, All-Star pitcher who pitched for six teams and won 138 games
February 15 – Bump Hadley, 58, pitcher who ended Mickey Cochrane's career with a 1937 pitch that fractured his skull; later a broadcaster
February 20 – Bill Hinchman, 79, outfielder twice batted .300 for Pittsburgh, later a scout
February 28 – Eppa Rixey, 71, pitcher elected to the Hall of Fame just one month earlier, until 1959 was the left-hander with most wins in NL history with 266 victories for Phillies and Reds
March 1 – Irish Meusel, 69, left fielder batted .310 lifetime, led NL in RBI in 1923
March 11 – Joe Judge, 68, first baseman batted .300 nine times for Senators, later coach at Georgetown for 20 years
March 29 – Wilcy Moore, 65, relief pitcher who won last game of 1927 World Series for Yankees

April–June
April 23 – Harry Harper, 67, pitched from 1913 through 1923 for the Senators, Red Sox, Yankees and Robins
May 4 – Dickie Kerr, 69, pitcher who as a 1919 rookie won two World Series games for the White Sox, as one of the players not involved in fixing the Series; later helping a struggling pitcher-turned-hitter, Stan Musial
May 22 – Dave Shean, 79, second baseman and captain of champion 1918 Red Sox
May 23 – Gavvy Cravath, 82, right fielder who won six home runs titles with Phillies
May 27 – Dave Jolly, 38, knuckleball relief pitcher for Milwaukee Braves from 1953 to 1957
June 6 – Charlie Mullen, 74, first baseman for White Sox and Yankees in 1910s
June 8 – Earl Smith, 66, catcher for five NL champions, batted .350 in 1925 World Series
June 18 – Ben Geraghty, 50, manager of the Jacksonville Suns of the International League and legendary minor league pilot who played a key role in the early career of Henry Aaron
June 24 – George Trautman, 73, president of the minor leagues since 1946
June 24 – Jud Wilson, 69, All-Star third baseman of the Negro leagues
June 28 – Frank "Home Run" Baker, 77, Hall of Fame third baseman, lifetime .307 hitter and 4-time home run champion, last surviving member of Philadelphia Athletics' "$100,000 infield"

July–September
July 27 – Hooks Dauss, 73, pitcher won 222 games, all for Detroit
August 15 – Karl Drews, 43, pitcher for four teams including 1947 champion Yankees
September 4 – Home Run Johnson, 90, early shortstop of the Negro leagues
September 19 – Slim Harriss, 66, pitcher for the Philadelphia Athletics and Boston Red Sox in the early 1920s
September 27 – Andy Coakley, 80, pitcher won 18 games for 1905 Athletics, later coach at Columbia for 37 years

October–December
October 2 – Cy Perkins, 67, catcher for 16 seasons, most with Athletics, later a coach for many years
November 6 – Clarence Mitchell, 72, spitball pitcher won 125 games, hit into unassisted triple play in 1920 World Series
November 12 – Ed Connolly, 54, catcher for the Boston Red Sox between 1929 and 1932
November 13 – Muddy Ruel, 67, catcher for 19 seasons including 1924 champions Senators, later a coach
November 14 – Oscar Melillo, 64, second baseman for Browns and Red Sox
December 8 – Red Worthington, 57, left fielder for Boston Braves from 1931 to 1934
December 30 – Wilbur Good, 78, outfielder for six teams, primarily the Cubs

Uniforms

In an attempt to create an identity distinguishable from all other teams, Kansas City Athletics owner Charlie Finley changed the team uniforms to kelly green and yellow. This tradition of "green and gold" has been preserved to this day, although the kelly green has since been replaced with forest green. Finley also changed the Athletics' cleats to white instead of the standard black. Coaches and managers were also given white hats, which were dropped when the Athletics adopted new colors in 1993. The white cleats were dropped in 2000, but were revived in 2008.

See also
1963 Nippon Professional Baseball season

References

External links
1963 Major League Baseball season schedule

 
Major League Baseball seasons